Together and Apart is a 1936 novel by the British writer Margaret Kennedy, her seventh novel. Kennedy was motivated to write it by an increasing number of divorces amongst her acquaintances.

Synopsis
In 1920s Britain, Betsy Canning has an outwardly comfortable existence a middle-aged housewife with three children, yet she lacks satisfaction in her life and comes to the conclusion it is due to the breakdown of her marriage to her husband Alec. Consequently she announces that she wants a divorce and hopes that they can do it in a civilised fashion. However the interference of various people, particularly her mother-in-law, ironically ends any hope of this or of reconciliation. She marries her uninspiring cousin while he, after an affair with their au pair, sets up house with her. Some years later the couple pass each other on the escalator at London Underground station and exchange glances.

References

Bibliography
 Humble, Nicola. The Feminine Middlebrow Novel, 1920s to 1950s: Class, Domesticity, and Bohemianism. Oxford University Press, 2004.
 Stringer, Jenny & Sutherland, John. The Oxford Companion to Twentieth-century Literature in English. Oxford University Press, 1996.
 Vinson, James. Twentieth-Century Romance and Gothic Writers. Macmillan, 1982.

1936 British novels
Novels by Margaret Kennedy
Novels set in England
Novels set in London
Novels set in the 1920s
Cassell (publisher) books